Harry Wall may refer to:

Harry Wall (American football), head football coach for the University of Richmond Spiders, 1904
Harry Wall (politician) (1894–?), member of the Washington State Senate

See also
Henry Wall (disambiguation)